Mamadou Sylla may refer to:
 Mamadou Sylla (politician) (born 1960), Guinean politician and business leader
 Mamadou Sylla (footballer, born 1975), Senegalese football defender
 Mamadou Sylla (footballer, born 1986), Senegalese football defender
 Mamadou Sylla (footballer, born 1994), Senegalese football forward
 Mamadou Sylla (footballer, born 2003), Spanish football midfielder